Thornton Stirling Russ (3 January 1922 – 9 February 1976) was a New Zealand cricketer. He played in three first-class matches for Wellington from 1940 to 1946.

See also
 List of Wellington representative cricketers

References

External links
 

1922 births
1976 deaths
New Zealand cricketers
Wellington cricketers
Cricketers from Auckland
Thorn